IF Rune is a sports club in Kungsör, Sweden, established on 28 April 1908. The club runs gymnastics and orienteering, earlier even bandy and soccer. The men's bandy team played in the Swedish top division in 1935. The men's soccer team played in the Swedish second division during the seasons of 1934–1935, 1936–1937 and 1937–1938.

References

External links
Official website 

IF Rune
Association football clubs established in 1908
Bandy clubs established in 1908
Defunct bandy clubs in Sweden
Defunct football clubs in Sweden
Gymnastics clubs
Orienteering clubs in Sweden
IF Rune
Sports clubs established in 1908